Vietnamosasa is a genus of Indochinese bamboo in the grass family.

Species
 Vietnamosasa ciliata (A.Camus) T.Q.Nguyen – Cambodia, Laos, Vietnam
 Vietnamosasa darlacensis T.Q.Nguyen – Vietnam
 Vietnamosasa pusilla (A.Chev. & A.Camus) T.Q.Nguyen – Cambodia, Laos, Vietnam, Thailand

References

Bambusoideae
Bambusoideae genera